"Wiley Flow" is a song by English rapper Stormzy, released on 15 September 2019 through #Merky and Atlantic Records as the third single from his second studio album, Heavy Is the Head. The song is a homage to British grime MC Wiley that interpolates flows from his tracks "Bad 'Em Up" and "Nightbus Dubplate". The cover art also mirrors his mixtape, Tunnel Vision Vol 1 (2007).

Critical reception
Writing for Fact, Henry Bruce-Jones called it a salute to the "godfather of grime" on which Stormzy "cribs flows" from Wiley and "go[es] in on" over a "murky instrumental". Karen Gwee of NME labelled it "hard-hitting", while Sajae Elder of The Fader described it as Stormzy "racing through a series of number and OG checks ("If you can't do 10K first week then I don't wanna hear no chat about numbers')".

Music video
The music video features Stormzy rapping the song while "surrounded by his friends in a gloomy basement".

Charts

Certifications

References

2019 singles
2019 songs
Stormzy songs
Songs written by Stormzy
Songs written by Wiley (musician)